St. Mark's Lutheran Church may refer to:
 St. Mark's Lutheran Church (Elberta, Alabama), listed on U.S. NRHP
 St. Mark's Lutheran Church (Guilderland, New York), NRHP

See also
 St. Mark's Church (disambiguation)